Chupanan Rural District is a rural district (dehestan) in Anarak District, Nain County, Isfahan Province, Iran. At the 2006 census, its population was 1,619, in 508 families.  The rural district has 18 villages.

References 

Rural Districts of Isfahan Province
Nain County